State Highway 25 (SH-25) is a  state highway in Idaho, United States, that runs east-west from Jerome in the west to Interstate 84 (I-84) north of Declo in the east. Idaho State Highway 25 also passes through Eden, Hazleton, Paul and Rupert.

Route description
SH-25 begins at a diamond interchange with I-84 before traveling due east as Main Street into the town of Jerome, where it intersects SH-79. After leaving the town, SH-25 continues due east through farmland, passing by Jerome County Airport and coming to a junction with US 93. SH-25 curves southeast before intersecting SH-50 and turning east again, passing through the towns of Eden and Hazelton. The road comes to a diamond interchange with I-84, where SH-25 continues east on I-84 until the next exit, where it splits to the northeast at another diamond interchange.

SH-25 continues east into the town of Paul where it intersects SH-27. After passing the Rupert Country Club, it comes to a T intersection with SH-24 and turns northeast, running concurrently with SH-24 through the city of Rupert, where SH-25 continues east as Baseline Road. The highway makes a sharp turn south, crossing the Snake River before terminating at I-84.

Major intersections

See also

 List of state highways in Idaho
 List of highways numbered 25

References

External links

025
Transportation in Jerome County, Idaho
Transportation in Minidoka County, Idaho
Transportation in Cassia County, Idaho